Kharod (Village ID 509398) is a village of the Mehsana district in Gujarat, India. It is 41 km from Gandhinagar(Capital of Gujarat),72 km from Ahmedabad, 12 km away from Vijapur, 14 km from Vadnagar 10 km from Vishnagar. Kharod is the place of birth of the Chief Minister of Gujarat, Anandiben Patel. Kharod is well connected by road. There are many temples and one Dargah (Mosque) named Oliya Peer ni Dargah in Kharod. There is a Jain temple dedicated to Shantinatha which was established by Budshisagar Suri. The devotees attend this temple every Sud Teras of Hindu month and perform Snatra Puja at the temple. Kharod is hometown of famous writer Sanjay Makwana.

According to the 2011 census it has a population of 6708 living in 1424 households.

References

Villages in Mehsana district